The Biak gerygone (Gerygone hypoxantha) is a species of bird in the family Acanthizidae. It is endemic to the islands of Biak and Supiori in West Papua, Indonesia.

Its natural habitats are subtropical or tropical moist lowland forests and subtropical or tropical moist shrubland.
It is threatened by habitat loss and is listed as vulnerable by the IUCN.

It was previously treated as a subspecies of the large-billed gerygone (Gerygone magnirostris).

References

Gerygone
Birds described in 1878
Birds of the Schouten Islands
Taxonomy articles created by Polbot
Endemic fauna of the Biak–Numfoor rain forests